Ralph R. Debbas (born 1987) is a Lebanese automotive entrepreneur, designer, and businessman. He is best known as the chief executive officer of W Motors, which he founded in 2012, and the designer of the Lykan HyperSport.

Early life and education 
Debbas was born in Lebanon in 1987 to a family of industrialists.

Debbas studied economics and began to study graphic design at the Lebanese American University. He quit his graphic design course to study automotive design, which he studied with honours at Coventry University after turning down an offer from the Pratt Institute in the USA.

Career in the automotive industry 
Before starting development of W Motors, Debbas worked as a designer for Land Rover and Aston Martin.

In 2009, Debbas launched Wolf Design and Innovation Group (WDI Group), of which he was listed as Executive Head of Design. WDI Group worked on a variety of projects including boats, furniture and interior design, consumer goods, and graphic/web design, and was active in Beirut and Paris.

He began development of W Motors and design of the Lykan in 2006, and in 2008 had several design projects sponsored by the European Union. W Motors was officially founded in 2012 with the launch of the Lykan HyperSport. It is the first Middle Eastern car manufacturer, making Debbas the first automotive executive in the Middle East. According to Debbas, the Lykan HyperSport was deliberately extravagant because:

He contributed to the design of the ICONIQ Model 7. The Fenyr SuperSport followed with production beginning in 2018, but was not designed by Debbas.

Debbas launched the W Motors consultancy division in 2019, which now makes up 70% of the company's business. As of 2020, he owns shares and is a director of W Motors Automotive Group Holding Limited. He continues as the CEO and chairman of W Motors S.A.L.

Views on the automotive industry 
Debbas has often spoken on the future of the transportation industry, particularly the impact of automation and electrification on vehicle ownership and manufacture.

Debbas believes that electrification of cars will become widespread and that as the development of self-driving technology advances, traditional car ownership will decline to the point were road transport is provided in a manner he compares to airlines: the role and importance of manufacturers will decline, and cars will be owned by providers. Because of this, he predicts his son Karl (born 2016) will never need to or may be unable to own a car or hold a driver's license.

He has stated that the Middle East has great potential for a local automotive industry, but lack of relevant knowledge in the region is a limiting factor.

Awards 
Debbas has been the recipient of several business and design awards during his career.

Personal life 
Debbas has an extensive personal collection of cars produced in the 1990s.

References

External links 

 W Motors official website
 WDI Group website (archived)

1987 births
Chief executives in the automobile industry
Lebanese chairpersons of corporations
Lebanese business executives
Lebanese chief executives
Emirati people of Lebanese descent
Alumni of Coventry School of Art and Design
Living people
Date of birth missing (living people)
Place of birth missing (living people)
Missing middle or first names
Lebanese company founders
Founders of automobile manufacturers